Wood Gundy Inc. was a leading Canadian stock brokerage and investment banking firm. Founded in 1905, it was acquired by the Canadian Imperial Bank of Commerce in 1988 as it attempted to build an investment banking business.  The Wood Gundy name was used extensively by the bank's investment banking arm, which was known as CIBC Wood Gundy until 1997.  Today, CIBC's investment banking business is known as CIBC World Markets, and the name CIBC Wood Gundy is used as the brand for the bank's retail brokerage business.

History

Founding and early history
Wood, Gundy & Company was established in Toronto, Ontario, in 1905 by George Herbert Wood and James Henry Gundy. The firm first specialized in the distribution and underwriting of government and municipal bonds  In 1919, the firm opened an office in New York City. Founded as a partnership, the firm incorporated in 1925.

Following World War II, Wood Gundy expanded its operations, starting to underwrite and distribute securities of Canadian corporations. Continued growth was driven through Canada's increasing industrialization and growing population, leading to greater demand for capital and investment securities. This expansion transformed Wood Gundy into a full-service investment house.  Wood Gundy was the first Canadian dealer to open an office in Tokyo, and the first firm to employ a female trader on the floor of the Toronto Stock Exchange.

The operations of the company, then called "Wood, Gundy & Company Limited", were split into two newly incorporated companies in 1962. The first, responsible for investment dealer operations, was called "Wood Gundy Securities Limited". The second, responsible for the investment holding business, was named "Wood Gundy Holdings Limited".  These two firms existed until the early 1970s, when they reunited as a single firm under the name "Wood Gundy Limited". At this time, Charles Gundy, the son of the founder, was Chairman.  Wood Gundy remained the largest brokerage and securities firm in Canada until the early 1980s, when the merger of Dominion Securities and A.E. Ames created the largest firm in the country.

Acquisition by CIBC

By the mid-1980s, Wood Gundy, which was owned by approximately 600 of its employees, was looking for a merger partner. In 1986, Wood Gundy had nearly merged with Gordon Capital Corporation, but that deal was aborted at the last minute.  By 1987, there were a number of banks actively pursuing a deal with Wood Gundy, including First National Bank of Chicago, the Union Bank of Switzerland and the Royal Bank of Canada, however these deals fell apart in the middle of the year due to high price expectations.  The firm was impacted by the 1987 stock market crash in October 1987 and intensified its efforts to find a buyer.

CIBC purchased a 60 percent stake in Wood Gundy in June 1988 for C$110 million (US$86 million), representing a total value of the firm of C$183 (US$143 million).   At the time of its acquisition, Wood Gundy was the leading Canadian investment dealer. Following the acquisition, CIBC formed CIBC Wood Gundy, which offered primarily asset management services for corporate and institutional clients.

Two years later, in 1990, CIBC continued to expand in the Canadian securities business by acquiring much of Merrill Lynch & Company's Canadian securities business.  The acquisition included 20 offices and between 700 and 800 employees as well as access for CIBC to Merrill's equity research.  The transaction made Wood Gundy once again the largest brokerage firm in Canada.  In 2001, CIBC would buy the remainder of Merrill's Canadian business.

In 1997, CIBC Wood Gundy acquired the U.S. brokerage house Oppenheimer & Co.  After the acquisition the U.S. division took the name CIBC Oppenheimer, eliminating the use of the Wood Gundy brand through much of the bank.

Executives

Chair
 George Herbert Wood (1925-1932): investment dealer, Sec/Supt of Sales, Manager with Dominion Securities Corp (1900-1905), Chairman of Victory Loans Special Committee 1911-1918, Acting President YMCA Toronto
 James Henry Gundy (1932-1951): investment dealer with Central Canada Loans and Savings Co. 1898-1902, Dominion Securities Corp. 1902-1905, Chair of Special Subscriptions Committee - Victory Loans 1911-1918, President - Investment Dealer Association of Canada 1920-1921, Governor -of the Investment Bankers' Association America, Director of Canada Cement, Massey-Harris, Simpsons Ltd, Dominion Steel and Coal Company.
William Pearson Scott (1961-1967)
 Charles Lake Gundy (1967-1978)
 John Hunkin (1990-1992): President of Investment and Corporate Banking CIBC WG 1992-1997, President of Investment and Corporate Banking CIBC World Markets 1997-1999

President
 James Henry Gundy (1925-1948)
 Charles Lake Gundy (1948-1978): World War II - Canadian Army 1939-1945, Vice-President 1945-1948, President 1948-1967, Chairman 1967-1978, son of JH Gundy
 Charles Edward "Ted" Medland (1978-1988)
 John Hunkin (1988-1990)

References

The Investment banking handbook.  John Wiley and Sons, 1988

Former investment banks
Defunct financial services companies of Canada
Stock brokerages and investment banks of Canada
Canadian Imperial Bank of Commerce
Financial services companies established in 1905
Financial services companies disestablished in 1988
1988 disestablishments in Ontario
1905 establishments in Ontario
Canadian companies established in 1905